The Treasurer of South Australia is the Cabinet minister in the Government of South Australia who is responsible for the financial management of that state's budget sector. The Urban Renewal Authority, trading as Renewal SA, lies within the Treasurer's portfolio.

The current Treasurer is The Hon. Stephen Mullighan , a member of the Australian Labor Party (South Australian Branch).

Responsibilities
The Treasurer is responsible for the financial management of the state of South Australia.

Renewal SA
Since 28 July 2020 and  the Urban Renewal Authority, trading as Renewal SA, has been within the Treasurer's portfolio. Renewal SA is responsible for undertaking, supporting and promoting urban development and urban renewal that aligns to the government's strategic plan, in particular the  30-Year Plan for Greater Adelaide (2017).

List of South Australian treasurers
The following is a list of treasurers of South Australia, from 1839 to present. As self-government and the Parliament of South Australia began in 1857, no official parliament record was kept and no definite evidence of the official holder of the office could be found prior to that year.

Before self-government

With self-government

References

External links
 SA Treasury

South
 
Lists of people from South Australia
1839 establishments in Australia
Ministers of the South Australian state government